Peter Kyberd is an academic specialising in engineering cybernetics. He is currently head of the School of Energy and Electronic Engineering at Portsmouth University and serves on the editorial board of the Journal of Prosthetics and Orthotics. His main research activity has been the practical application of technology to rehabilitation and engineering in Orthopaedics.

Education 
Kyberd has a first class degree from Durham University (Hatfield College), where he completed the science stream of the General Studies course and graduated in 1982. He then earned a MSc in Electronic Engineering from Southampton University, followed by a PhD from the same institution for work on the digital control of a multifunction prosthetic hand.

Career 
After spending the previous decade working at the Oxford Orthopaedic Engineering Centre (part of the Nuffield Orthopaedic Centre), Kyberd lectured in the Cybernetics Department of Reading University, where he was part of the team that performed the first implant of a bi-directional nerve sensor on a healthy human being. In 2003 he took up the Canada Research Chair in Rehabilitation Cybernetics at the Institute of Biomedical Engineering, University of New Brunswick, where I conducted research in the clinical application of intelligent prosthetic arms, energy storage and return in prosthetic ankles and was part of the Upper Limb Prosthetics Outcome Measures Group (ULPOM), promoting the use of validated and standardised tools of prosthetic assessment. In 2015 he joined the University of Greenwich to serve as head of the Engineering and Science Department, before moving on to Portsmouth in November 2018.

One early innovation was the use of sensitive microphones to detect when an object gripped by a prosthetic hand was slipping.  Using this, he was able to design a hand which could pick up a raw egg without breaking it.  He has also focused on duplicating the complex axes of movement of the hand, particularly the thumb.

References

External links
 Progress of a modular prosthetic arm, A Poulton, P J Kyberd, D Gow, Universal Access and Assistive Technology, Springer, 2002.

Living people
Canadian engineers
Year of birth missing (living people)
Academics of the University of Portsmouth
Cyberneticists
Alumni of Hatfield College, Durham
Alumni of the University of Southampton